Tolerance is a 2000 Brazilian drama film directed by Carlos Gerbase.

Cast 
 Maitê Proença - Márcia
 Roberto Bomtempo - Júlio
 Maria Ribeiro - Anamaria
  - Guida
 Nélson Diniz - Teodoro
 Werner Schünemann - Juvenal
  - Ciro
 Júlio Andrade - Pizza deliver
  - Emanuel

References

External links 

2000 drama films
2000 films
Brazilian drama films
2000s Portuguese-language films